The word joiner (WJ) is a format character in Unicode used to indicate that word separation should not occur at a position, when using scripts such as Arabic that do not use explicit spacing.

The word joiner does not produce any space and prohibits a line break at its position. Thus, it is a nonbreaking space with zero width.

The word joiner replaces the zero-width no-break space (ZWNBSP, U+FEFF), as a usage of the no-break space of zero width. Character U+FEFF is intended for use as a byte order mark (BOM) at the start of a file. However, if encountered elsewhere, it should, according to Unicode, be treated as a zero-width no-break space. The deliberate use of U+FEFF for this purpose is deprecated as of Unicode 3.2, with the word joiner strongly preferred.

See also
 Byte order mark, which uses  (ZWNBSP) character
 Zero-width space
 Zero-width joiner

References

Control characters
Unicode formatting code points